Dmitry Saveliev (born 25 May 1971, Novosibirsk) is a Russian political figure and deputy of the 6th, 7th, and 8th State Dumas.

After graduating from the university, Saveliev engaged in business. In 2008, he joined the Liberal Democratic Party of Russia. From 2009 to 2013, he coordinated the Kemerovo branch of the party. In 2010–2011, he was an assistant to the deputy of the 5th State Duma Arkady Svistunov. On December 4, 2011, he was elected deputy of the 6th State Duma. He was re-elected in 2016 and 2021 for the 7th, and 8th State Dumas. He joined the United Russia in 2021.

References

1971 births
Living people
United Russia politicians
21st-century Russian politicians
Eighth convocation members of the State Duma (Russian Federation)
Seventh convocation members of the State Duma (Russian Federation)
Sixth convocation members of the State Duma (Russian Federation)